Dacrydium balansae is a species of conifer in the family Podocarpaceae. It is found only in New Caledonia.

References

balansae
Least concern plants
Taxonomy articles created by Polbot
Taxa named by Jean Antoine Arthur Gris
Taxa named by Adolphe-Théodore Brongniart